James O'Loughlin (19 January 1902 – 29 April 1959) was an Irish hurler who played as a right corner-back for club side Thurles Sarsfields and at inter-county level with the Tipperary senior hurling team.

Honours

Player

Thurles Sarsfields
Tipperary Senior Hurling Championship (1): 1929

Tipperary
All-Ireland Senior Hurling Championship (1): 1930
Munster Senior Hurling Championship (1): 1930

Selector

Tipperary
All-Ireland Senior Hurling Championship (1): 1937
Munster Senior Hurling Championship (1): 1937

References

1902 births
1959 deaths
Thurles Sarsfields hurlers
Tipperary inter-county hurlers
Hurling selectors